The term four mirrors, or "the Four Mirrors," may refer to:

 Mirror armour, of Mughal and Mongol "Four Mirrors" ("char-aina") type.
 Shikyō (Japanese: 四鏡) "Four Mirrors"; four Japanese history books of the Muromachi Period 
 Sijing (Chinese: 四鏡) "Four Lenses"; article in the Huashu with the earliest known reference to the basic types of simple lenses